Moturakau is one of 22 islands in the Aitutaki atoll of the Cook Islands. It is located in the southeast of Aitutaki Lagoon between the larger islands of Rapota and Tekopua, six kilometres to the southeast of the main island of Aitutaki. The island is 460m long and 120m wide. Moturakau served as a leper colony from the 1930s to 1967. More recently, it was home to the 'Sharks' for four years of the UK reality TV programme Shipwrecked: Battle of the Islands.

References

Islands of Aitutaki